Nauru competed at the 2014 Summer Youth Olympics, in Nanjing, China from 16 August to 28 August 2014.

Athletics

Nauru qualified one athlete.

Qualification Legend: Q=Final A (medal); qB=Final B (non-medal); qC=Final C (non-medal); qD=Final D (non-medal); qE=Final E (non-medal)

Girls
Track & road events

Weightlifting

Nauru was given a quota to compete in a boys' event by the tripartite committee.

Boys

References

2014 in Nauruan sport
Nations at the 2014 Summer Youth Olympics
Nauru at the Youth Olympics